"Whole Again" is a song by British girl group Atomic Kitten for their debut studio album, Right Now (2000). It was co-written by Orchestral Manoeuvres in the Dark members and Atomic Kitten founders Andy McCluskey and Stuart Kershaw, along with Jem Godfrey and Bill Padley, with production helmed by McCluskey and Kershaw under their production moniker Engine. Godfrey and Padley are credited as additional producers.

It is the group's biggest selling single to date and was the final single to feature founding member Kerry Katona, who left the group midway through promoting the single. "Whole Again" was the first single released from the album in Europe and South Africa. It was a massive success, reaching number one in several countries and selling over a million copies in the UK alone.

The four writers were nominated for the Ivor Novello Award for excellence in songwriting, and Billboard ranked the track number 96 on their list of the "100 Greatest Girl Group Songs of All Time". Multiple artists, including OMD, have covered the song. Following the departure of Katona, she was replaced a few days later by Jenny Frost of fellow English girl group Precious, just after the single topped the UK Singles Chart. As a result, the music video was reshot and Frost's vocals appeared on the reissue of Right Now.

Background
"Whole Again" was written and produced by Orchestral Manoeuvres in the Dark members and Atomic Kitten founders Andy McCluskey and Stuart Kershaw. A mid-tempo ballad that combines a strolling beat and one-note string crescendos, it initially featured all lines spoken by Kerry Katona with only the chorus sung by Liz McClarnon and Natasha Hamilton. While this version was included on the Japanese version of Atomic Kitten's debut album Right Now (2000), Innocent Records A&R manager Hugh Goldsmith felt that it was still a half‑finished song and asked songwriters and producers Jem Godfrey and Bill Padley to re-write it for the UK version of the album. With the chorus being already there, Godfrey and Padley decided on writing a melody for the verses and changed most of the chords in "Whole Again", but they were not able to change its key. Padley later described the process as "quite difficult, because the chorus of the song was so hooky that the verse had to lead up to it but not overshadow it, which is why it ended up sounding as low as it does. We very carefully worked out what the vocal range of the Kittens was, because the last thing we wanted was to write a melody that was fantastic but that they wouldn't be able to sing."

Recording of the new verses took place at  Padley's West Hampstead music studio. A hasty affair due to the band's hectic schedule at that time, much of the vocals were recorded within 30 minutes, with McClarnon and Hamilton each singing the whole song twice only. As well as recording the new vocals, Godfrey and Padley also took over the job of producing "Whole Again", although they were careful to preserve the features of McCluskey and Kershaw's original version, including Katona's spoken middle-8 section. While the duo kept much of the "underwater organ sound" from the original session, they were forced to replay and retune other elements and added a few additional percussion and string loops from the sample albums Vinylistics 3 and  Advanced Orchestra to the track. Padley and singer friend Angie Giles also provided vocals for the gospel part near the end of the song for which the producers tracked about forty vocals and put several delays and effects on it to sound like a choir. While Innocent Records liked their version, they asked Godfrey and Padley to re-record McClarnon and Hamilton's vocals at least two more times, though they eventually decided on using the original vocals that had been recorded in West Hampstead in the end.

Release
While Innocent Records planned to release "Whole Again" as Atomic Kitten's fourth single at times, it was eventually replaced by "Follow Me" to lead the UK release of parent album Right Now. Following the commercial underperformance of both "Follow Me" and the initial release of the album, Atomic Kitten persuaded their label to release "Whole Again" as a last-ditch attempt to keep their record deal. During promotion for the single, Katona announced her pregnancy and subsequent decision to leave the group. With the single's release imminent, the group opted to recruit Jenny Frost, previously a member of fellow British girl group Precious, as a replacement and continued their promotional campaign. The version with Frost's spoken word portion replaced the original version for radio airplay, and it was subsequently included on a reissue of Right Now. An alternate take of Frost's vocals was issued as a bonus track on international versions of the group's second album, Feels So Good.

Chart performance
The single debuted at number one in the United Kingdom with first-week sales of 69,286 copies, staying atop the chart for four weeks and increasing in sales during every week that it was at number one. It has since gone on to sell over 1,000,000 copies in the UK alone. It is the fourth best-selling single by a girl group of all time, after "Wannabe" and "2 Become 1" by the Spice Girls and "Never Ever" by All Saints. It also became the 13th overall best-selling single of the 2000s decade. As of November 2016, it remains the biggest-selling song of the 21st century in the UK by a girl group.

In Australia, "Whole Again" peaked at number two on the ARIA Singles Chart, being certified double platinum for shipments of over 140,000 copies. The single was also released in Germany and New Zealand, where it secured the number-one position for six consecutive weeks in both countries. In Germany, the single was certified platinum for shipments exceeding 500,000, while in New Zealand, it was certified double platinum, denoting sales of over 20,000. It additionally peaked atop the charts of Austria, Ireland, and the Netherlands, as well as the Eurochart Hot 100. In Denmark, Flanders, Romania, Spain, Sweden, and Switzerland, it entered the top 20.

Music video
The music video for "Whole Again" was filmed on a very small budget due to the commercial failure of previous single "Follow Me". It features the Kittens singing in front of a plain white background—similar to the video for the Sugababes' debut single, "Overload". The original version of the video includes Kerry Katona, who had left the group just before the song's release. Much of the video was subsequently reshot to feature new member Jenny Frost.

As a result of the single's huge success in many international markets, a second music video was filmed for the U.S. release in May 2001 with a much larger budget. This version features the three women walking through the streets in Downtown Los Angeles and walking out into the countryside, gradually picking up more people along the way. The video ends with the camera zooming out on the field making the crowd take on the shape of Atomic Kitten's logo.

Track listings

UK CD single
 "Whole Again" – 3:03
 "Holiday" – 3:13
 "Whole Again" (Whirlwind Mix) – 3:05

UK limited-edition CD single
 "Whole Again" – 3:03
 "Whole Again" (original version) – 3:17
 "Locomotion" – 3:32

European CD and cassette single
 "Whole Again" – 3:04
 "Locomotion" – 3:32

French CD single
 "Whole Again" – 3:03
 "Whole Again" (Whirlwind Mix) – 3:05

Credits and personnel
Credits are lifted from the liner notes of Right Now.

Studios
 Recorded at Motor Museum Studios (Liverpool, UK) and Wise Buddah Studios (London, UK)
 Mixed at Wise Buddah Studios (London, UK)

Personnel
 Andy McCluskey – writing, keys and programming
 Stuart Kershaw – writing, keys and programming
 Jem Godfrey – writing, keys and programming, additional production and remix
 Bill Padley – writing, backing vocals, keys and programming, additional production and remix
 Atomic Kitten – vocals
 Angie Giles – backing vocals
 Engine – production
 Pete Craigie – engineering
 Pat O'Shaughnessy – engineering

Charts

Weekly charts

Year-end charts

Decade-end charts

All-time charts

Certifications and sales

Release history

"Southgate You're the One"

During England's run to the semi-finals of the 2018 FIFA World Cup, the song was adopted as a football chant by England fans in honour of manager Gareth Southgate. The lines "Baby you're the one / You still turn me on / You can make me whole again" were changed to "Southgate, you're the one / You still turn me on / Football's coming home again". The song had previously been adapted by Celtic fans earlier in the 2017–18 season in honour of defender Mikael Lustig.

Andy McCluskey, one of the song's original songwriters, said about England fans adapting it into one of their chants, "The Kittens are really chuffed and are actually considering remaking the single with the England lyrics. Any time something you've created becomes widely accepted is humbling and touching. I wonder who made that first connection by starting to sing it, and suddenly everyone was doing it." During the 2018 World Cup before England's quarterfinal against Sweden, which England won 2–0, Natasha Hamilton shared a video of herself on Twitter singing the alternate lyrics.

On 3 July 2021 during UEFA Euro 2020, Atomic Kitten then returned to perform the song with reworked lyrics including the existing alternate ones in front of chanting football fans at a watch party at Boxpark Croydon for England's quarterfinal against Ukraine, which England won 4–0. On 6 July 2021, the day before England's semi-final against Denmark, the group released an official full-length version of the adapted song called "Southgate You're the One (Football's Coming Home Again)" via Columbia Records UK. Jenny Frost rejoined the band following a 13-year break to re-record the single.

Charts

References

2000 songs
2001 singles
2003 singles
2021 singles
Atomic Kitten songs
Columbia Records singles
Cultural depictions of association football players
Dutch Top 40 number-one singles
European Hot 100 Singles number-one singles
Football songs and chants
Innocent Records singles
Irish Singles Chart number-one singles
Music videos directed by Trey Fanjoy
Number-one singles in Austria
Number-one singles in Germany
Number-one singles in New Zealand
Number-one singles in Scotland
Orchestral Manoeuvres in the Dark songs
Song recordings produced by Desmond Child
Songs written by Andy McCluskey
Songs written by Bill Padley
Songs written by Jem Godfrey
Songs written by Stuart Kershaw
UK Singles Chart number-one singles
Virgin Records singles
2000s ballads